"Hyperventilating" is a song by Jamaican reggae fusion singer Tami Chynn. It was released as the first single from her first album, Out of Many...One, which was released through SRC Records and Universal Music.

Background
The song uses the riddim that Stepz Medley used in other reggae songs like "We Be Burnin'" by Sean Paul. The single was her first song to be released outside of Jamaica after being signed to Universal Mowtown Records but only managed to be an online hit failing to enter the charts.

Music video
The video was directed by Tim Naylor and shot at Shadow Studios in New York City in October, 2005

The video starts with footage of Tami Chynn riding on the back of a scooter and then shows her dancing in a house with flashes to other dancers.

Formats and track listings
These are the formats and track listings for "Hyperventilating".

12" vinyl promo
"Hyperventilating" — 3:31
"Hyperventilating (Instrumental)" — 3:26
"Hyperventilating (T.O.K. Remix)" — 3:18
"Hyperventilating (T.O.K. Remix Instrumental)" — 3:18

Netherlands promo single
"Hyperventilating" — 3:31
"Hyperventilating (T.O.K. Remix)" — 3:18

Japan maxi-single
"Hyperventilating" — 3:31
"Hyperventilating (T.O.K. Remix)" — 3:18

US single
"Hyperventilating" — 3:31
"Hyperventilating (T.O.K. Remix)" — 3:18
"Looky Looky" — 5:46
"Hyperventilating (Multimedia Track)"

References

2007 singles
Tami Chynn songs
2006 songs
SRC Records singles